Khaled Boukacem (born 24 April 1985) is an Algerian footballer who plays for Olympique de Médéa as a goalkeeper.

References

External links

1985 births
Living people
Association football goalkeepers
Algerian footballers
USM Blida players
USM El Harrach players
CR Belouizdad players
JS Saoura players
Olympique de Médéa players
Algerian Ligue Professionnelle 1 players
21st-century Algerian people